Pereulixia kosiensis, the Kosi rockskipper, is a species of combtooth blenny found in the western Indian ocean.  This species reaches a length of  SL.  This species is currently the only known member of its genus.

References

Salarinae
Fish described in 1908
Monotypic fish genera